New York's 45th State Assembly district is one of the 150 districts in the New York State Assembly. It has been represented by Michael Novakhov since 2023, defeating then-incumbent Steven Cymbrowitz.

Geography 
District 45 is located in Brooklyn, comprising portions of Midwood, Manhattan Beach, Brighton Beach, Gravesend, and Sheepshead Bay.

Recent election results

2022

2020

2018

2016

2014

2012

2010

References

Politics of Brooklyn
45